Carson City School District  (CCSD) is a school district headquartered in Carson City, Nevada. As of 2015 Richard Stokes is the superintendent.

It is the sole school district in Carson City.

Schools
Carson High School
Middle schools:
 Carson Middle School
 Eagle Valley Middle School
Elementary schools:
 Bordewich-Bray Elementary School
 Empire Elementary School
 Fremont Elementary School
 Fritsch Elementary School
 Mark Twain Elementary School
 Al Seeliger Elementary School

References

External links
 

School districts in Nevada
Education in Carson City, Nevada